American singer-songwriter Billie Eilish is the recipient of several awards and nominations, including seven Grammy Awards, six MTV Video Music Awards, three Billboard Music Awards, three Brit Awards, two Teen Choice Awards, four Nickelodeon Kids' Choice Awards, a Golden Globe Award, and a People's Choice Award,  as well as an Academy Award (Oscar). Awarded 4 iHeartRadio Music Awards along with the accomplishment of reaching 1 Billion Total Audience Spins for “bad guy”.

In 2019, Eilish received two Guinness World Records, "Most simultaneous US Hot 100 entries by a female" and "Youngest female at No.1 on UK albums chart".


Awards and nominations

Other accolades

World records

Notes

References

Awards
Eilish, Billie